The 1996 LSU Tigers football team represented Louisiana State University in the 1996 NCAA Division I-A football season.  LSU finished with a 10–2 overall record (6–2 in SEC play) after defeating Clemson Tigers, 10–7, in the Peach Bowl. It was Gerry DiNardo's second season as head coach and the Tigers built upon the previous year's success with their first ten-win season and bowl win since 1987. The Tigers tied for the SEC West title with Alabama, but had lost to the Tide 26–0 in Baton Rouge in a game that was notable for being Shaun Alexander's breakout performance.

Schedule

Roster

References

LSU
LSU Tigers football seasons
Peach Bowl champion seasons
LSU Tigers football